Complexa is red Portuguese wine grape used in the production of Madeira. The grape was created as a crossing of Castelao, Muscat Hamburg and Tintinha in the 1960s. The grape provides a deep color with less tannins than the commonly used Tinta Negra Mole.

See also
List of Portuguese grape varieties

References

Red wine grape varieties
Madeira wine